Dear Friends was a live radio program performed by the Firesign Theatre on KPFK radio in Los Angeles. Twenty-one episodes aired between September 16, 1970 and February 17, 1971. These programs were recorded and later edited into one-hour shows distributed on 12" LPs for national syndication. In January 1972, the group released a Dear Friends double album, a compilation of what they considered to be the best segments from the radio program.  The original broadcasts were released in 2010 on the group's Duke of Madness Motors DVD compilation. Another album distilled from the Duke of Madness Motors set, Dope Humor of the Seventies, which also collected material from the Dear Friends radio shows, was released in 2020.

Episodes

Episode #1 - Live At The Ash Grove
Originally aired live on KPFK on  November 15, 1970

Tracks - side one
Intros
P.B. Intros Freddy Earth
Vegetables
Dr. Memory
Animals
Tongue Exercises (P.P.)
Religious Items
Whales
Rap On Cartoon Men Dagwood & Jigs
Segue > Drunks
Arms
Letter From Tokyo
American Koan
Egyptians (P.B.)
Skeleton
Pirates
F.T. Anniversary
Joke Contest
P.B.'S Close
Last Chord Of Music

Tracks - side two
Shaky Open
Music Break (Silhouettes)
Applause
P.P. Bit
Hole Earth Estates
Teenie Weenies
Animals
Vaudeville Act
Georgia Island Story
Don G. O'vanni Spot (40 Great Unclaimed Melodies)
Thanksgiving Piece (The P.A. Encore)
Leary-Duck
President's Names Rap
Thank You

Episode #2 - Power Is Trouble and Trouble's Not Funny
Originally aired live on KPFK on November 1, 1970

Tracks - side one
Satie Opening
Animals In Army
Glaubner's Disease
Dr. Spitz and Dog
Commerce
Dying Pig
Party Lecture
Dr. Memory Show
Citizen X Reviews Firesign Theatre Album
Giant Toad
Mark Time
Mission Inn
Early Farming
P.A. - P.B. Coal
D.O. Coal
Coal Improv
Moon Worms
Amoeba To Oil
P.P. Speech

Tracks - side two
Duck
Winter
BBQ Chanters
Police Records
Leg O Crow
"What's So Funny" Jokes
Willie Sutton
Morning T.V. Guide
D.O. Book Report
P.B. -P.A. On Book Reports
Questions For Kids
Presidents
Names
P.P. Announcement
Harmonica Solo
More Kids Questions
News Items
P.A. Reading
D.O. Whole Earth Poem
Indian Land
Power
Fanfare

Episode #3 - I Could Always Shoot Him With The Camera
Originally aired live on KPFK on October 4, 1970

Tracks - side one
Equipment Trouble
Japanese Miniature T.V.S
Surrogate Mothers
Hair
Drunks
President and Committee (Live From The Senate Bar)
The Greening Of America Discussion

Tracks - side two
Orson Welles Bit
Punter's Girls
Sound Effects War
Fresh Chef
Sex Jail
Sex Movies
W.C. Fields
FDR And Hitler
P.P.'S The Mutt and Smutt Show

Episode #4 - Somebody Put A Mickey In The Ground Zero
Originally aired live on KPFK on October 11, 1970

Tracks - side one
Yale Distorts Tape  – 8:15
Conk's Coal Ad
Rocket Scientists's Lunch
"Chucko"
News Items: Sophia Loren, Fires, Agnew
Famous Comic's School
Child And Models At Mott's Miniatures
Can You Stop This

Tracks - side two
Hitler
Opinion Research
The Chinchilla Show
Real America Items
Mixville Rocket News
Spud Commercial
Disaster Reports
Rocket-Fags
Us Census
Crabs(?)
Writer's School Spot
Mutt and Smutt
Music Bit
The Compromise ATC
Warning
Blast-Off

Episode #5 - All We Have To Fear Is Me
Originally aired live on KPFK on December 9, 1970

Tracks - side one
D.O. Intro
Toad Away Hymn
Book Of Punter
Sermonizing
"They Heard Us Talking"
Pudy Valee
President's Songs
Lomesome Beet Song(O:14)
Navy Dress Regs
Heaves Of Hoove
P.P. As FBI Agent
P.B. Kicks On Nix
Music Break
D.O. - Ad Billboard
P.P. Zen Story
P.B. Andalusion Dog
P.P. Poem
Ufos
Sodom And Jubalee
2 Idiots For Peace
Pauser's Manifesto
Dr. Tim In Algeria
Youthful Folly

Tracks - side two
D.O. Luie's Ad
P.P. Pavlov's Dog
Pooche's Beer Hall
Afternoon T.V. Guide
Watching T.V.
I Am An American
Luci and Desi
C.B. Demille Movie
Beer Ads
Music Break
Food Ad
Hoove's Dogs
Lavender Hoove
Fish War
Weather Report
Carozzi Pot Garden
Beaner Dealers
Gym Hs
Fod On T.V.
Nightinjail JHS
G. Canyon Suite
Fudd
Johnny
Marvin Ratman
Recruiting For FBI
Zen Story
Squash Outro

Episode #6 - Deputy Dan Will Find Us No Matter Where We Go
Originally aired live on KPFK on November 8, 1970

Tracks - side one
Savings and Loan Spot
Beer Drinking
Tri-City Spot
Education
Cock Teasing
Bears and Boars
Baliol Bros. Spot
Mudslide
The F(L)Ag
Police
Aliens Spot
Hanging Athenian Gardens
Criogenics - Foster Freeze
Rabbits
Lucky Duck
News Items
Plane Bombings
Boys Books
Chicanos
Baliol
Deputy Dan
Police Car
Accident
Amos and Andy

Tracks - side two
Baliol Spot
G. Washington Letter
Dr. Memory
Baliol
P.B.-Operation Bootstrap
Fuse Of Doom
Baliol Spot
Tongue Exercises

Episode #7 - Was There A Cow On The Moon?
Originally aired live on KPFK on November 29, 1970

Tracks - side one
Barn Dance Opening
Peter's Birthday
P.P.'S German
Movie Score
Mars-Marsh
Motorcycle
Bird-Dog Song
Dik-Dik Story
Pears-Paris
Tarzan
Copper Smelting
Sex Problems
T.V. Guide Girl
P.P.'S "Bluff" Piece
Pain Pills
Brautigan Poem
Golgotha Discussion
Basket Boys
War
GI Bills

Tracks - side two
Businessman's Lunch
Three Questions
Homosexuals And Doctors
Copper Smelting
Badges
Armegeddon
War With The Cows
"Hell"
Message In Rocket Sequence
Rose In Spanish Harlem Music Trip
Men On The Moon
Film-Makers
Horse-Players
Silence
2-Minute Light
Money
45 Seconds To Go...

Episode #8 - Being On Radio Is More Fun Than Watching TV
side one originally aired live on KPFK on October 18, 1970
side two originally aired live on KPFK on December 6, 1970

Tracks - side one
Columbia School Of Broadcasting
Women
City Of The Future
Sermon
"Can't Say That On The Air"
Women's Shoes
Steel Hat
Dr. I.Q.'S Announcing School
The Curbfront Shysters
Pluto Water
Census Taking
Serman Continues
A Letter Disappears
Hitler's Umlaut
Discipline
P.B. Spills The Coffee
Playback Of Spill
Sermon Continued
Lick-A-Boot

Tracks - side two
Negros A Go Go
P.A.'S T.V. Guide
Winnie The Pooh - "Eeyore's Birthday"

Episode #9 - Dr. Memory's Laff-A-While News
Originally aired live on KPFK on January 10, 1971

Tracks - side one
Good News Items
News Opening
Production Code
Bear Story
Cops Broadcasting
Hippie Words
Newscasters
Offensive Words
More Cops
Old Postman
Jackie Globenfelt Story
Selma W. Selma Song
The Morgans
Gump Door(?)
Rocket
Mixville
Bringing Up Father
Baxter Ward On Fiji
Famous Speakers School
Car Wash Ad
Dr. Memory

Tracks - side two
Fiji Islanders
Welsh Accents
Prohibited Words
Exercises
Greaso Practice
Cigarette Ads
Ecology
Army Recruiting
Garden Club News
French Mother Goose Song And Story
Production Code Standards
Russian Book
Children's Zoo
Disappearance Of Animals
P.P.'S Grandfather's Letter
Mixville Rocket
George Put-Put News Ad
Dr.Memory

Episode #10 - All Nite Images
Originally aired live on KPFK on January 17, 1971

Tracks - side one
P.B.'S Voice Prints Of The 60s Spot
P.P. On Concerts
Sleep Researchers
Truck Stop Cafe'
Cell Meeting
Mental Illness Statistics
Fighter Ace
Dall Show
Bottomless Hot Dog Stand
Professional Digester
Glutton's Church
The Pause
Trains
Roman Games Trip
"Doing His Thing" Bit
P.P.'S Ed's Restaurant Spot
Broadcaster's School
Jew In Palm Springs
Yale And Bimidji
Business Meeting: Priests
Help The Hoove Fund
Dialset Story
Negro Records
Duke Of Madness Motors Spot

Tracks - side two
Latin-Rocket Trip
First Buffalo
Extinct Animals
Ike Speech
State Of The Union Race
Big Bomb Scare
"The Young Polluters"
Hoove T.V. Series
Sex Mailer
And Dirty Pix
Sex On T.V.
Review Of "Trash"
Homosexuals
The Talking Porpoise
Blind Kids Sniff Pot
Lady Driver
Russian Driver
Kidnappers
Reminisences Of T.F.T.
Alchemy
Summer Police & Doctors Festival
Outdoor Sales
Beaners
Crucified TV
Truck Stop Reprise

Episode #11 - Welcome To Microorganism State Park
Originally aired live on KPFK on January 24, 1971

Tracks - side one
Jiver Intro
Melon Mtn. Opening
Technical Breakdown
Popularization Of Art
Saigon Yale Club
Jewish Times Story
Kung Fu Ad
Dr. Dog As Brickbreaker
Pet Pills At Fair
Kid Roundup
Kids In The Street
Gravity On Reds
Merc. In Fish
Pres. Punter & Color T.V.S
Rabbit Pellets
Beaners Scoring Weed
Cow Trip (The Cows Are Not Afraid Of The Dr.)
Dr. Whiplash Show
Bazerko Lounge Spot
Dear Nominee Set
P.B. In Holiday Inns
Sheep
4th Record - Jim & Spade Nixon
Dr. Memory Set

Tracks - side two
Jefferson And The Mason (From the October 18, 1971 live broadcast)
P.P. On Sheep
D.O.'S Ecology Pitch
Tenner's Guide
Whiskey Law
Voices, Forest Growing
Witches Brew
Conquistador Club
Animals You Won't See
Earthworms
(Etc. A Mix Of All These To:)
Forest Fire Stories
"We'll Never Forget"
Clock Striking
Rent Parties
Chinese-Spades
Robert Kelly Reading
Talk About The Poem
Dirty Words
Marijuana Scare - Replay
5 Min Light
Hollow Trees
Where Trees Come From & What They Are Made Of
Russian Poem To Sleep
Dr. Memory Tag

Episode #12 - Is This The Machine That Answers No "N" Yes?
Side one originally aired live on KPFK on February 3, 1971 and October 18, 1970.
Side two originally aired live on KPFK on February 17, 1971.

Tracks - side one
"Dead Air"
P.B.'S Mick Jagger Story  – 1:20
Fanfare
Old Men-Vegetables
Rain Falling & Plants Growing
Judgement Of The Birds
Arm Band Plays "Rudolph"
Ascap Financial Report
Agnew
Plastique
"La Condicion Humaine"
Propane Car
Bing Crosby On Teens
Youth-Sex Games On Parade
"Paranoia" Piece
P.B.'S Andalusion Dog Poem
P.P.'S Statement Of Principals
P.A.'S Monte Cristo
D.O.'S Swing Music (From the February 17, 1971 live broadcast)
Station Break (The Firesign Theatre's "Single" release - side A)

Tracks - side two
"Rainin" Music Out
Cabin Rest. Spot
Yes and No Machine
Quotes And Questions
Ben Hur
Women In Wwii
New Money
Monastery In White House
Elkheart Trains
Laugh Track
Stanford Train Trip
Computors On Acid
Subway Tour Guide
"Mr. Prominent"
Bundles
Forward Into The Past (The Firesign Theatre's "Single" release - side B)
Termites Eat Steel
US Seal
Old Cars
Statistics
Earthquake Farewell

Issues and reissues
These shows were distributed to radio stations on 12 inch, white label LPs.

Selected parts of these shows were released by the group on the Columbia Records label as the double album Dear Friends in 1972.
Other parts were released — without mention of their origin — as parts of the group's Just Folks... A Firesign Chat album on Butterfly Records in 1977.

Between June 15 and September 28, 2010, New York radio station WFMU (with the cooperation of the Firesign Theatre) aired a 16-week series of archival shows which included all but episodes 1, 8, 10, and 12 of the syndicated Dear Friends in chronological order along with an unsyndicated Dear Friends episode broadcast on September 16, 1970 ("Big Brother Is Washing") and episodes of their other KPFK series, The Firesign Theatre Radio Hour Hour and Let's Eat.  As of October 2010, the individual programs from this run are available for streaming via the WFMU website, and a selection of the shows rebroadcast by the station are also available via iTunes.

References

 Firesigntheatre.com, January 19, 2006
 Firezine.net, January 20, 2006
 Smith, Ronald L. The Goldmine Comedy Record Price Guide. Iola: Krause, 1996.

The Firesign Theatre
American comedy radio programs
Surreal comedy radio series
1970s American radio programs